Titas Stremavičius (born 15 February 1998) is a Lithuanian chess player who holds the title of Grandmaster (GM, 2019). He is winner of Lithuanian Chess Championship (2021).

Biography 
Titas Stremavičius was multiple participant of European Youth Chess Championships and World Youth Chess Championships in different age categories. The his main achievement is the bronze medal of the 2015 European Youth Chess Championship in the category under 18 (shared 2nd-3rd places with Manuel Petrosyan and lost the tie-break).

Titas Stremavičius is Lithuanian Chess Champion in 2021. He is silver medalist of the Lithuanian Chess Championships in 2015 and 2016 (in 2016, he shared 1st-2nd places with Tomas Laurušas and lost on additional indicators).

Titas Stremavičius is winner of the Baltic Cup 2014 (chess tournament with the norm of the international master).

Titas Stremavičius is winner of Open Chess Tournaments in Lichtenrade (2015), Panevėžys (2018), and participated in a large shared of 1st place in the open tournament in Charlotte (2021).

He is winner of International Chess Tournaments in Panevėžys (2016),, Charlotte (2018, 2019 and 2022, tied 1st-2nd with Jennifer Yu in 2018), with Zhou Jianchao in 2022), St. Louis (2019), New York City (2021).

Titas Stremavičius played for Lithaunia in the Chess Olympiads:
 In 2018, at fourth board in the 43rd Chess Olympiad in Batumi (+4, =5, -0),
 In 2022, at second board in the 44th Chess Olympiad in Chennai (+3, =2, -5).

In 2015, he was awarded the FIDE International Master (IM) title and received the FIDE Grandmaster (GM) title four years later.

References

External links 

1998 births
Living people
Chess grandmasters
Lithuanian chess players
Sportspeople from Kaunas